Brickellia gentryi is a Mexican  species of flowering plants in the family Asteraceae. It is found only in the state of Durango in northwestern Mexico.

Brickellia gentryi is superficially similar to B. lanata but has thinner leaves and white, nodding (hanging) flower heads in groups of 2–3.

The species is named for American botanist Howard Scott Gentry, 1903–1993.

References

gentryi
Flora of Durango
Plants described in 1992